Juan Valera Espín (born 21 December 1984) is a Spanish retired professional footballer. He operated as a defender or midfielder, on the right side of the pitch.

He amassed La Liga totals of 200 matches and eight goals over 11 seasons, representing in the competition Murcia, Atlético Madrid, Racing de Santander and Getafe.

Club career
Born in Murcia, Valera made his professional debut at hometown's Real Murcia, and first played in La Liga in 2003–04, appearing in ten games during the season. In 2005–06 he moved to Atlético Madrid, where his progression was marred by injuries; on 25 February 2006, he scored twice as a substitute in a 5–0 home win against Málaga CF.

On 1 September 2008, Valera agreed to a one-year loan at Racing de Santander. On 5 October he netted his first goal for the Cantabrians, in a 1–0 last-minute away victory over CA Osasuna; he also scored in December, but in an insufficient 3–1 UEFA Cup group stage defeat of Manchester City.

Recalled for 2009–10, Valera also suffered initially with physical problems. However, he would manage to appear regularly for Atlético over the course of the campaign – more than 30 official matches – mainly as a right back, competing with internationals Luis Perea and Tomáš Ujfaluši for the position. He contributed with seven games in the Colchoneros Europa League victorious run, although only three complete, including the 1–2 away defeat against Liverpool in the semi-finals (2–2 aggregate win); he also featured one minute in the final.

In mid-August 2011, after Valera and Atlético amicably terminated the player's contract, which expired in June of the following year, he signed with fellow top division side Getafe CF. During his first season he was first-choice right back, replacing longtime incumbent Miguel Torres, and scored his first goal on 26 November 2011 whilst handing FC Barcelona their first loss of the campaign through a 67th-minute header, for the game's only goal at the Coliseum Alfonso Pérez.

Again through a set piece and with his head, in the second fixture of 2012–13, Valera scored the equaliser to help Getafe to an eventual 2–1 home win against Real Madrid. On 3 June 2015, he left the club after his contract expired.

Honours
ClubAtlético MadridUEFA Europa League: 2009–10
Copa del Rey runner-up: 2009–10

InternationalSpain U23'
Mediterranean Games: 2005

References

External links

1984 births
Living people
Footballers from Murcia
Spanish footballers
Association football defenders
Association football midfielders
La Liga players
Segunda División players
Tercera División players
Real Murcia Imperial players
Real Murcia players
Atlético Madrid footballers
Racing de Santander players
Getafe CF footballers
UEFA Europa League winning players
Spain under-21 international footballers
Spain under-23 international footballers
Competitors at the 2005 Mediterranean Games
Mediterranean Games medalists in football
Mediterranean Games gold medalists for Spain